"In the Stars" is a song by Swedish duo Icona Pop from their second studio album This Is... Icona Pop (2013). The song was written by the duo, Jarrad Rogers, Fransisca Hall, and Anjulie Persaud. The remix of the song, titled "In the Stars (Galaxy Mix)", was released for digital download and streaming on 3 September 2013 through TEN, Big Beat, and Atlantic as the promotional single.

Personnel
Credits adapted from Tidal and Genius.
 Icona Pop vocals, songwriting, co-producing
 Jarrad Rogers songwriting, producing, programming, instruments
 Fransisca Hall producing, backing vocals
 Anjulie Persaud producing
 Chris Gehringer mastering
 John Hanes engineering
 Serban Ghenea mixing
 Matt Beckley vocal producing, recording engineering

Charts

Release history

References

2013 singles
2013 songs
Icona Pop songs
Songs written by Aino Jawo
Songs written by Caroline Hjelt
Songs written by Jeff Bhasker
Big Beat Records (American record label) singles